The British Swimming Championships - 200 metres breaststroke winners formerly the (Amateur Swimming Association (ASA) National Championships) are listed below. The event was originally contested over 220 yards and then switched to the metric conversion of 200 metres in 1971.

In 1962 Anita Lonsbrough set a world record of 2.52.2 sec in the final.

200 metres breaststroke champions

See also
British Swimming
List of British Swimming Championships champions

References

Swimming in the United Kingdom